"Black Tie White Noise" is the title track from British singer-songwriter and actor David Bowie's 1993 album of the same name. Featuring guest vocals by Al B. Sure!, it was produced by Nile Rodgers and released as the second single from the album in June 1993.

Background 
The track was inspired by Bowie's stay in Los Angeles in April 1992, when the city saw race riots in reaction to the Rodney King incident. It is the epitome of its parent album's feelings towards conformity and corporations, with Benetton and the saccharine charity single "We Are the World" among the targets. Bowie would later explain that the track was concerned with the black community's own identity, and how it didn't need to be absorbed into the white community.

It is among the most jazz- and soul-influenced tracks on the album, highlighted by the key vocal of Al B. Sure!, although Lenny Kravitz was reportedly Bowie's first choice for the duet. Essentially a rhythm and blues tune, the song ultimately reinforced the feeling of Bowie's tendency as a chameleon of musical styles.

Release 
Released as the album's second single, "Black Tie White Noise" was a top 40 hit in Britain and subsequently reached No. 36 in the UK chart and No. 74 in Australia.

Critical reception 
Alan Jones from Music Week wrote, "This oddly churning but attractive track is a little too slow for current dancefloor tastes. Not as instant as many of Bowie's bigger hits, it will need a lot to push it into the top end of the chart. A moderate hit." Parry Gettelman from Orlando Sentinel felt it's "one of the better ones" on the album, adding, "The groove is faux-funky, and the melody is undercooked, but Bowie's trumpet injects flavor, and the lyrics have something to say about race relations in America: "Getting my facts from a Benetton ad/ looking through African eyes/ lit by the glare of an L.A. fire/ I've got a face, not just my race." Bowie's cool, detached voice is nicely partnered by that of soul singer Al B. Sure!, and Bowie sneaks in a Marvin Gaye allusion." James Hamilton from the RM Dance Update described it as a "gloomy slow roller". Leesa Daniels from Smash Hits gave it five out of five, declaring it as "fabulous", "funky and soulful – and you could listen to it again and again and never get bored. Genius."

Music video 
A music video for this piece was produced by Mark Romanek, featuring a montage of African-American youth playing in urban Los Angeles, while intercut with scenes of Bowie in a blue suit with his saxophone and Al B. Sure! singing. The music video attempted to capture Bowie's image behind the song: multiple ethnic groups coexisting with their own identities, and not attempting to absorb one another.

Track listing 

 7" version
 "Black Tie White Noise" (Radio Edit) (Bowie) – 4:10
 "You've Been Around" (Dangers Remix) (Bowie, Gabrels) – 4:24

 12" version
 "Black Tie White Noise" (Extended Remix) (Bowie) – 8:12
 "Black Tie White Noise" (Trance Mix) (Bowie) – 7:15
 "Black Tie White Noise" (Album Version) (Bowie) – 4:52
 "Black Tie White Noise" (Club Mix) (Bowie) – 7:33
 "Black Tie White Noise" (Extended Urban Mix) (Bowie) – 5:32

 CD version
 "Black Tie White Noise" (Radio Edit) (Bowie) – 4:10
 "Black Tie White Noise" (Extended Remix) (Bowie) – 8:12
 "Black Tie White Noise" (Urban Mix) (Bowie) – 4:03
 "You've Been Around" (Dangers Remix) (Bowie, Gabrels) – 4:24

 US commercial CD (Savage 74785-50045-2)
 "Black Tie White Noise" (Waddell's Mix) – 4:12
 "Black Tie White Noise" (3rd Floor Mix) – 3:42
 "Black Tie White Noise" (Al B. Sure! Mix) – 4:03
 "Black Tie White Noise" (Album Version) – 4:52
 "Black Tie White Noise" (Club Mix) – 7:33
 "Black Tie White Noise" (Digi Funky's Lush Mix) – 5:44
 "Black Tie White Noise" (Supa Pump Mix) – 6:36

 US promo DJ 12" (Savage SADJ-50045-1)
 "Black Tie White Noise" (Extended Remix) – 8:12
 "Black Tie White Noise" (Club Mix) – 7:33
 "Black Tie White Noise" (Trance Mix) – 7:15
 "Black Tie White Noise" (Digi Funky's Lush Mix) – 5:44
 "Black Tie White Noise" (Supa Pump Mix) – 6:36
 "Black Tie White Noise" (Funky Crossover Mix) – 3:45
 "Black Tie White Noise" (Extended Urban Remix) – 5:32

 US promo DJ CD (Savage SADJ-50046-2)
 "Black Tie White Noise" (Chr Mix 1) – 3:43
 "Black Tie White Noise" (Chr Mix 2) – 4:12
 "Black Tie White Noise" (Churban Mix) – 3:45
 "Black Tie White Noise" (Urban Mix) – 4:03
 "Black Tie White Noise" (Album edit) – 4:10

 'CHR Mix 1' is the '3rd Floor Mix' on the regular US CD
 'CHR Mix 2' is the 'Waddell's Mix' on the regular US CD
 'Urban Mix' is the 'Al B. Sure! Mix' on the regular US CD

Tracks #1-3 re-produced, re-arranged and mixed by Marc 'Funkyman' Paley, Raul 'DJ EFX' Recinos & Jeremy 'DJ Digit' Cowan
Track # 2 remix and additional production by John Waddell
Track # 4 remix and additional production by Al B. Sure & Timar

Credits and personnel 
 Producers:
 Nile Rodgers
 Musicians:
David Bowie – vocals
Al B. Sure! – vocals
Nile Rodgers – guitar
Barry Campbell – bass
Sterling Campbell – drums
Richard Hilton – keyboards
Lester Bowie – trumpet
Reeves Gabrels – guitar on "You've Been Around"

Charts

Other releases 
 On the bonus disc following the 10th anniversary edition of Black Tie White Noise the remixes "3rd Floor US Radio Mix" and "Here Come Da Jazz" appeared.

Cover versions 
 The Rockridge Synthesiser Orchestra – Plays David Bowie Classic Trax

Other uses 
A sample of the first bar of the song is the basis for the song Tziporen from the 1994 album Iver be-lev yam by the Israeli singer Eran Zur.

References 

 Black Tie White Noise Limited Edition DVD, 2004
 Pegg, Nicholas, The Complete David Bowie, Reynolds & Hearn Ltd, 2000, 

1993 singles
David Bowie songs
Music videos directed by Mark Romanek
Songs about black people
Songs against racism and xenophobia
Songs written by David Bowie
Song recordings produced by Nile Rodgers
1992 songs
Arista Records singles
Bertelsmann Music Group singles
Al B. Sure! songs
1992 Los Angeles riots